Mahmoudieh may refer to:

 Yasmine Mahmoudieh, Iranian architect
 Mahmoodieh, a neighbourhood in Tehran
 Al-Mirr, Ma'moudieh was the old name of this village

See also
 Mahmoudiyeh F.C., a football team in Afghanistan
 Mahmud (disambiguation)

Iranian-language surnames